Olympic Stadium East station, formerly Xiangxinglu station during planning until 2007, is a station of Line 2 of the Nanjing Metro. It started operations on 28 May 2010 along with the rest of Line 2. On 30 September 2016 the station served a peak volume of 31,300 passengers.

Around the station
 Jinling Library

References

Railway stations in Jiangsu
Railway stations in China opened in 2010
Nanjing Metro stations